Javier Justiz Ferrer (born September 18, 1992) is a Cuban professional basketball player for Vaqueros de Bayamón of the Baloncesto Superior Nacional (BSN). He has earlier spent three seasons with Basket Zaragoza of the Liga ACB in Spain.

Professional career
On August 6, 2018, Justiz signed a two-year deal with Casademont Zaragoza of the Liga ACB. He  averaged 8.2 points and 4.7 rebounds per game during the 2019-20 season. On August 6, 2020, Justiz signed a three-year extension with the team.

National team career
Justiz represented the senior Cuban national basketball team at the 2015 FIBA AmeriCup, and at the 2016 Centrobasket, where he recorded the most minutes played, points scored, rebounds and blocks for his team.

References

External links
 Javier Justiz at archive.fiba.com
 Javier Justiz  at acb.com 
 Javier Justiz at eurobasket.com
 Javier Justiz at realgm.com

1992 births
Living people
Basket Zaragoza players
Bucaneros de La Guaira players
Centers (basketball)
Central American and Caribbean Games bronze medalists for Cuba
Central American and Caribbean Games medalists in basketball
Competitors at the 2018 Central American and Caribbean Games
Cuban expatriate sportspeople in Spain
Cuban men's basketball players
Estudiantes Concordia basketball players
Cuban expatriate basketball people in Spain
Liga ACB players
San Lorenzo de Almagro (basketball) players
Sportspeople from Santiago de Cuba
21st-century Cuban people